The following is a list of German National Socialist propaganda films. Before and during the Second World War, the Reich Ministry of Public Enlightenment and Propaganda under Joseph Goebbels produced several propaganda films designed for the general public. Production of films made to serve a propaganda purpose was not limited to the Axis powers, but was produced by both sides, such as the Allies' production of propaganda films.

The list of films may contain films concerning several different subjects or genres, but who all functioned as propaganda films of the Third Reich.

Legend
Release date: The date of the film's release (or premiere)
Original title: The film's original German title
English title: English language title (titles in italic marks official English title)
Running time: Length of the film as released
Type: Genre and function
Producer: The producer(s) of the film
Director: The director(s) of the film
Cast: Leading actors and actresses
Notes: Additional comments and notes, such as propaganda use and post-war history.

Before the War (1933–1939)

Wartime films (1939–1945)

See also
 :de:Liste der am höchsten prädikatisierten NS-Spielfilme
 :de:Liste der unter alliierter Militärzensur verbotenen deutschen Filme

References

External links
 IMDB list over films banned by the Allied Control Council after the War

Nazi propaganda films